The Woman Without Nerves (German: Die Frau ohne Nerven) is a 1930 German adventure film directed by Willi Wolff and starring Ellen Richter, Walter Janssen and Anton Pointner. Interiors were filmed at the Staaken Studios in Berlin. Shot during 1929, it did not premiered until January 1930 at the Marmorhaus in Berlin.

The film's sets were designed by the art director Walter Reimann.

Cast
 Ellen Richter as Ellen Seefeldt 
 Walter Janssen as Eduard Lindt, Berichterstatter 
 Anton Pointner as Vanderstraat 
 Julius Falkenstein as Der Chefredakteur 
 Henry Bender as Faktotum 
 Georg John as Sekretär 
 Robert Garrison 
 Valy Arnheim as Pilot 
 Paul Henckels
 Arthur Duarte
 Max Paetz
 Toni Tetzlaff
 Wolfgang von Schwindt

References

Bibliography 
 Bock, Hans-Michael & Bergfelder, Tim. The Concise CineGraph. Encyclopedia of German Cinema. Berghahn Books, 2009.

External links 
 

1930 films
1930 adventure films
German adventure films
Films of the Weimar Republic
German silent feature films
Films directed by Willi Wolff
German black-and-white films
Silent adventure films
1930s German films
Films shot at Staaken Studios
1930s German-language films